Peter Wolstenholme Young  (born  in Sydney) is a retired Australian judge who served as a judge on the Supreme Court of New South Wales for 27 years, retiring in 2012.

Career
Born in Sydney, Young was educated at Sydney Church of England Grammar School before graduating with a Bachelor of Laws from the Sydney Law School at the University of Sydney. Young's family has a strong legal pedigree. His father, James Young, was admitted as a barrister in 1933; Young's grandfather, James Young Snr., was admitted as a barrister in 1903; and Young's great-grandfather, Richard Young, was admitted as a barrister in 1873. In more recent years, Young's eldest son, Marcus, also a barrister, joined the bar in 1993 and was appointed as a Senior Counsel in 2011.

Young was appointed as a puisne judge in 1985 before being appointed as Chief Judge in Equity, serving from 2001 until 2009. He was appointed as a judge of the New South Wales Court of Appeal in 2009 and served until his retirement in 2012. Young was a justice of the Supreme Court of New South Wales, the highest court in the state of New South Wales, which forms part of the Australian court hierarchy.

In 2004, Young was appointed an Officer in the Order of Australia for service to law and the administration of justice, to legal scholarship and to the community through the Anglican Church of Australia.

He edited the Australian Law Journal for 24 years, retiring in April 2016.

Young is currently the Chairman of the Sydney Bus Museum.

References

 

1940 births
Living people
Australian King's Counsel
Judges of the Supreme Court of New South Wales